Mohsin Jamil Baig is a Pakistani senior journalist, analyst, and Chief Editor of Online International News Agency and Daily Jinnah Newspaper. He had been considered a close friend and confidant of Prime Minister Imran Khan from 2013 to 2019, but his relations deteriorated with PM Imran Khan after he wasn't given any government appointment.   

In February 2022, he was arrested by FIA in a raid by the complaint of federal minister Murad Saeed. Baig was arrested for quoting Reham Khan's book while talking about Murad Saeed's performance in Gharida Farooqi show. His arrest was later declared illegal by the High Court of Pakistan.

References

Living people
Pakistani male journalists
People from Islamabad
Year of birth missing (living people)